Holconotus is a genus of beetles in the family Carabidae. The scientific name of the genus is for the first time published in 1846 by Schmidt-Goebel. Contains the following species:

 Holconotus africanus Tschitscherine, 1898
 Holconotus brunneus (Jedlicka, 1935)
 Holconotus crassimargo Tschitscherine, 1898
 Holconotus ferrugineus Schmidt-Goebel, 1846
 Holconotus gigas (Andrewes, 1937)
 Holconotus madagascariensis Tschitscherine, 1900
 Holconotus rufus Chaudoir, 1876
 Holconotus sinuatus Tschitscherine, 1898
 Holconotus variabilis (Straneo, 1960)

References

Pterostichinae